The Chicoana are a Diaguita tribe in the Salta Province, Argentina.

External links
Chicoana Salta, Spanish

Diaguita
Indigenous peoples in Argentina